The Ministry of the Interior is a ministry of the government of Ghana.

About the Ministry
The Ministry is headed by the Minister of Interior, who is appointed by the President of Ghana and is approved by the Ghana Parliament after a vetting process. The Minister of Interior is Ambrose Dery since January 2017.

Objectives of the Ministry
In order to ensure the proper functioning of the Ministry, it has it functions being divided into seven major objectives. These are aimed at achieving the wholist purpose of the Ministries aim of maintaining internal peace:
Ensure adequate protection of life and property.
Ensure effective and efficient crime prevention and detection.
Strengthen disaster prevention, management and social mobilisation.
Regulate and monitor the entry, stay and exit of nationals of all countries.
Develop a highly efficient and humane custodial and reformatory system.
Improve institutional capacity.
Improve the public relations system.

Related agencies
The Ministry of Interior being the government's chief agency in charge of maintenance and enforcement of Internal Law and Order has agencies under it that have specific functions aimed at achieving the overall purpose of the Ministry and the country as a whole.
The Institutions through which the Ministry performs its functions are:

To achieve its mandate and objectives, the Ministry operates through ten (10) Agencies:

 Ghana Police Service
 Ghana Prisons Service
 Ghana National Fire Service
 Ghana Immigration Service
 Narcotics Control Commission
 National Disaster Management Organization
 Gaming Commission of Ghana
 National Commission on Small Arms and Light Weapons
 National Peace Council
 Ghana Refugee Board

References

Interior
Ghana